Glaucocharis epiphaea is a species of moth in the family Crambidae. It was described by Edward Meyrick in 1885. It is endemic to New Zealand.

References

Diptychophorini
Moths described in 1885
Moths of New Zealand
Endemic fauna of New Zealand
Taxa named by Edward Meyrick
Endemic moths of New Zealand